This is a list of writers either born in Ireland or holding Irish citizenship, who have a Wikipedia page. Writers whose work is in Irish are included.

Dramatists

A–D
John Banim (1798–1842)
Ivy Bannister (born 1951)
Sebastian Barry (born 1955)
Colin Bateman (born 1962)
Samuel Beckett (1906–1989)
Brendan Behan (1923–1964)
George A. Birmingham (1865–1950)
Dermot Bolger (born 1959)
Angela Bolster (1925-2005)
Dion Boucicault (1820–1890)
Colm Byrne (born 1971)
Úna-Minh Chaomhánach (born 1991)
Marina Carr (born 1964)
Austin Clarke (1896–1974)
Padraic Colum (1881–1972)
William Congreve (1670–1729)
James Cousins (1873–1956)
Anne Devlin (born 1951)
Roddy Doyle (born 1958)
Gary Duggan (born 1979)
Lord Dunsany (1878–1957)

E–J
John Ennis (born 1944)
St John Ervine (1883–1971)
Bernard Farrell (born 1941)
Brian Friel (1929–2015)
Fannie Gallaher (1854-1936)
William Nugent Glascock (c. 1787–1847)
Oliver Goldsmith (c. 1728–1774)
Lady Augusta Gregory (1852–1932)
Gerald Griffin (1803–1840)
James Augustus Hicky (fl. 1780s)
Declan Hughes (born 1963)
Denis Johnston (1901–1984)
Jennifer Johnston (born 1930)
Marie Jones (born 1951)
James Joyce (1882–1941)
John O'Keeffe (1747–1833)

K–P
Patrick Kavanagh (1904–1967)
John B. Keane (1928–2002)
Cathy Kelly (born 1966)
Thomas Kilroy (born 1934)
Jerome Kilty (1922–2012)
Deirdre Kinahan (born 1968)
Conor Kostick (born 1964)
Hugh Leonard (1926–2009)
C. S. Lewis (1898–1963)
Micheál Mac Liammóir (1899–1978)
Donagh MacDonagh (1912–1968)
Walter Macken (1915–1967)
Ian Macpherson (living)
Aodhán Madden (1947–2015)
Edward Martyn (1859–1923)
John McCann (1905–1980)
Martin McDonagh (born 1970)
Frank McGuinness (born 1953)
Christina McKenna (living)
Conor McPherson (born 1971)
M. J. Molloy (1914–1994)
George Moore (1852–1933)
Jimmy Murphy (living)
John Murphy (1924–1998)
Tom Murphy (1935–2018)
T. C. Murray (1873–1959)
Seán O'Casey (1880–1964)
Philip Ó Ceallaigh (born 1968)
Joseph O'Connor (living)
Antoine Ó Flatharta (living)
Mary Devenport O'Neill (1879–1967)
Mark O'Rowe (born 1970)
Cathal Ó Searcaigh (born 1956)
Robert Owenson (1744–1812)

Q–Z
Christina Reid (1942–2015)
Lennox Robinson (1886–1958)
Billy Roche (born 1949)
G. Bernard Shaw (1856–1950)
Peter Sheridan (born 1952)
Richard Brinsley Sheridan (1751–1816)
George Shiels (1881–1949)
John Millington Synge (1871–1909)
Colin Teevan (born 1968)
Colm Tóibín (born 1955)
Joseph Tomelty (1911–1995)
Mervyn Wall (1908–1997)
Enda Walsh (born 1967)
Oscar Wilde (1845–1900)
W. B. Yeats (1865–1939)

Non-fiction

Biography and memoirs

Úna-Minh Caomhánach (Úna-Minh Kavanagh, born 1991), memoirist
Bill Cullen (living) author, and businessman
Emma Dabiri (living) author, academic, and broadcaster
Edith Newman Devlin (1926–2012) author and academic
Julia Kavanagh (1824–1877), biographer and social scientist
Malachy McCourt (living), actor and politician
Tomás Ó Criomhthain (1856–1937), memoirist
Thomas O'Crohan (1856–1937), biographer (in the Irish language)
Muiris Ó Súilleabháin (Maurice O'Sullivan, 1904–1950), memoirist

Gardening and natural history
Helen Dillon (born 1940), gardener
Diarmuid Gavin (born 1964), gardener
Marcus Hartog (1851–1924), natural historian
William Henry Harvey (1811–1866), natural historian
Dermot O'Neill (living), gardener
William Robinson (1838–1935), gardener

History
Peter Brown (born 1935)
Seathrún Céitinn (Geoffrey Keating, c. 1569 – c. 1644)
Roy Foster (born 1949)
Gerard Anthony Hayes-McCoy (1911–1975)
Anthony Holten (1945–2020)
Geoffrey Keating (Seathrún Céitinn, c. 1569 – c. 1644)
James Kelly (born 1959)
Thomas Leland (1722–1785)
F. S. L. Lyons (1923–1983)
John A. Murphy (born 1927)
Richard Barry O'Brien (1847–1918), historian and journalist
John Cornelius O'Callaghan (1805–1883)
Colmán N. Ó Clabaigh, friar and historian 
Matthew Potter (living)
Sharon Slater (living)
James Ware (1594–1666)
Cecil Woodham-Smith (1896–1977)

Journalism and broadcasting
Brian Farrell (1929–2014), broadcaster
Gene Kerrigan (living), journalist
Robert Wilson Lynd (1879–1949), essayist
Karen Frances McCarthy (living), journalist
Norah Meade (1888–1954), journalist
Fintan O'Toole (born 1958), journalist
Cornelius Ryan (1920–1974), journalist and historian
Richard Steele (1672–1729), journalist and politician
John Waters (born 1955), journalist

Literature and language
Elizabeth Bowen (1899–1973), literary critic
Mrs. E. M. Field (1856–1940), literary critic and education

Morality and ethics
John Bale (1495–1563)
Nicholas Bernard (1600–1661)
Richard Paul Blakeney (1820–1884)
Maxwell Henry Close (1822–1903)
Frances Power Cobbe (1822–1904), writer on religious and social issues and fine arts
John Duncan Craig (1830–1909)
Edward Daly (1933–2016), bishop
Eamon Duffy (born 1947)
Desmond Fennell (1929–2021)
C. S. Lewis (1898–1963)
John Lynch (c. 1599 – c. 1677), religious writer and historian
Catherine Mary MacSorley (1848–1929)
Richard Baptist O'Brien (1809–1885)
Fintan O'Toole (born 1958)
William Thompson (1775–1833)
James Ussher (1581–1656), bishop
John Waters (born 1955)
Richard Whately (1787–1863), religious writer and economist

Music
Aloys Fleischmann (1910–1992)
Tilly Fleischmann (1882–1967)

Philosophy
George Berkeley (1685–1753)
George Boole (1815–1864)
Dermot Moran (living)
Desmond Fennell (1929–2021) 
Richard Kearney (born 1954)
John Moriarty (1938–2007)
Brendan Sweetman (born 1962)
William Thompson (1775–1833)

Politics
Thomas Amory (c. 1691–1788)
Roger Boyle, 1st Earl of Orrery (1621–1679)
John Wilson Croker (1780–1857)

Women's issues
Maeve Kelly (born 1930)
Nell McCafferty (born 1944)
William Thompson (1775–1833)

Miscellaneous
Eugene Davis (1857–1897), travel writer, poet
Edward MacLysaght (1887–1986), genealogist
Dervla Murphy (born 1931), travel writer 
George O'Brien (born 1945), academic
John O'Hart (1824–1902), genealogist
Seamus O'Mahony (born 1960), medical writer
Brendan Simms (born 1967), politician
Francis Stoughton Sullivan (1715–1766), lawyer
Maev-Ann Wren (living), economist

Novelists

A–C
John Banim (1798–1842)
Michael Banim (1796–1874)
John Banville (born 1945)
Leland Bardwell (born 1922)
Kevin Barry (born 1969)
Sebastian Barry (born 1955)
Samuel Beckett (1906–1989)
Brendan Behan (1923–1964)
Gerard Beirne (born 1962)
Maeve Binchy (1940–2012)
George A. Birmingham (1865–1950)
Dermot Bolger (born 1959)
Elizabeth Bowen (1899–1973)
John Boyne (born 1971)
Maeve Brennan (1916–1993)
John Broderick (1924–1989)
Ken Bruen (born 1951)
Aifric Campbell (born before 1976)
Lucy Caldwell (born 1981)
William Carleton (1794–1869)
Joyce Cary (1888–1957)
Jane Casey (born 1977)
Austin Clarke (1896–1974)
Brian Cleeve (1921–2003)
Eoin Colfer (born 1965)
Padraic Colum (1881–1972)
Evelyn Conlon (born 1952)
Colm Connolly (born 1942)
June Considine (born before 1959)

D–J
Seamus Deane (1940–2021)
Frank Delaney (1942–2017)
Brian Oswald Donn-Byrne (1889–1928)
Emma Donoghue (born 1969)
Gerard Donovan (born 1959)
Roddy Doyle (born 1958)
Catherine Dunne (born 1954)
Lord Dunsany (1878–1957)
Maria Edgeworth (1767–1849
Anne Enright (born 1962)
J. G. Farrell (1935–1979)
Anne Marie Forrest (born 1967)
Oliver Goldsmith (1728–1774)
Gerald Griffin (1803–1840)
Hugo Hamilton (born 1953)
Dermot Healy (born 1947)
Aidan Higgins (born 1927)
Desmond Hogan (born 1950)
Arlene Hunt (born 1972)
Jennifer Johnston (born 1930)
Neil Jordan (born 1950)
James Joyce (1882–1941)
John le Carré (1931–2020)

K–R
John B. Keane (1928–2002)
Molly Keane (1904–1996, writing as M.J. Farrell)
Cathy Kelly (born 1966)
Marian Keyes (born 1963)
Charles Kickham (1828–1882)
David M. Kiely (born 1949)
Celine Kiernan (born 1967)
Conor Kostick (born 1964)
Derek Landy (born 1974)
Charles Lever (1806–1872)
C. S. Lewis (1899–1963)
Morgan Llywelyn (born 1937)
Rosina Bulwer Lytton (1802–1882)
Brinsley MacNamara (1890–1963, real name John Weldon, see The Valley of the Squinting Windows)
Ian Macpherson (living)
Deirdre Madden (born 1960)
David Marcus (1924–2009)
Charles Robert Maturin (1782–1824)
Colum McCann (born 1965)
Barry McCrea (born 1974)
Frank McCourt (1930–2009)
John McGahern (1934–2006)
Christina McKenna (born 1957)
Anna McPartlin (born 1972)
Brian Moore (1921–1999)
George Moore (1852–1933)
Lady Morgan (Sidney Owenson, c. 1776–1859)
Danny Morrison (born 1953)
Iris Murdoch (1919–1999)
James Murphy (1839–1921)
Éilís Ní Dhuibhne (born 1954)
Edna O'Brien (born c. 1932)
Billy O'Callaghan (born 1974)
Philip Ó Ceallaigh (born 1968)
Joseph O'Connor (born 1963)
Mary O'Donnell (born 1954)
Peadar O'Donnell (1893–1986)
Liam O'Flaherty (1896–1984)
Valentine O'Hara (1875–1941)
Jamie O'Neill (born 1962)
Louise O'Neill (born 1985)
Brian O'Nolan (1912–1966, writing as Flann O'Brien and Myles na gCopaleen)
TS O'Rourke (born 1968)
Glenn Patterson (born 1961)
James Plunkett (1920–2003)
Katherine Purdon (1852–1920)
Keith Ridgway (born 1965)
Frank Ronan (born 1963)
Sally Rooney (born 1991)

S–Z
John W. Sexton (born 1958)
Darren Shan (born 1972)
Somerville and Ross (Edith Somerville, 1858–1949, and Violet Florence Martin, 1862–1915)
Laurence Sterne (1713–1768)
Bram Stoker (1847–1912)
Francis Stuart (1902–2000)
Jonathan Swift (1667–1745)
Kate Thompson (born 1959)
Colm Tóibín (born 1955)
Robert Tressell (1870–1911)
William Trevor (1928–2016)
Ethel Lilian Voynich (1864–1960)
William Wall (born 1955)
Maurice Walsh (1879–1964)
Leonard Wibberley (1915–1983)
Oscar Wilde (1854–1900)
Niall Williams (born 1958)

Poets

A–D
Adomnán (c. 624 – 704)
Æ: George William Russell (1867–1935)
William Allingham (1824–1889)
Leland Bardwell (1922–2016)
Eaton Stannard Barrett (1786–1820)
Richard Barrett (1740–1818)
Beccán mac Luigdech (fl. c. 650)
Samuel Beckett (1906–1989)
Brendan Behan (1923–1964)
Gerard Beirne (born 1962)
Eavan Boland (1944–2020)
Dermot Bolger (born 1959)
Pat Boran (born 1963)
Blathmac mac Con Brettan (fl. c. 750)
Frances Browne (1816–1887)
Ciarán Carson (1948–2019)
Patrick Chapman (born 1968)
Austin Clarke (1896–1974)
Brendan Cleary (born 1958)
Brian Coffey (1905–1995)
Colmán mac Lénéni (530–606)
Padraic Colum (1881–1972)
James Cousins (1873–1956)
Cuirithir of Connacht (fl. 7th century)
John Cunningham (1729–1773)
Dallán Forgaill (c. 560 – 640)
Thomas Davis (1814–1845)
Cecil Day-Lewis (1904–1972)
John F. Deane (born 1943)
Denis Devlin (1908–1959)
John Dillon (1816–1866)
Gerard Donovan (born 1959)
William Drennan (died 1820)
Charles Gavan Duffy (1816–1903)
Seán Dunne (1956–1995)
Lord Dunsany (1878–1957)
Paul Durcan (born 1944)

E–L
Flann Mainistreach (died 1056)
Patrick Galvin (born 1927)
Monk Gibbon (1896–1987)
Oliver St. John Gogarty (1878–1957)
Oliver Goldsmith (c. 1730–1774)
Sarah Maria Griffin (c1988)
Stephen Gwynn (1864–1950)
Michael Hartnett (1944–1999)
Randolph Healy (born 1956)
Seamus Heaney (1939–2013)
F. R. Higgins (1896–1941)
Pearse Hutchinson (1927–2012)
Douglas Hyde (1860–1949)
Valentin Iremonger (1918–1991)
John Jordan (1930–1988)
James Joyce (1882–1941)
Trevor Joyce (born 1947)
Patrick Kavanagh (1904–1967)
Thomas Kinsella (1928-2021)
Charles Kickham (died 1882)
Anatoly Kudryavitsky (born 1954)
Emily Lawless (1845–1913)
Francis Ledwidge (1887–1917)
C. S. Lewis (1899–1963)
James Liddy (1934–2008)
Ruth Frances Long (born 1971)
Michael Longley (born 1939)
Luccreth moccu Chiara (fl. c. 580)
Brian Lynch (born 1945)

M–P
Denis Florence MacCarthy (1817–1868)
Donagh MacDonagh (1912–1968)
Thomas MacDonagh (1878–1916)
Patrick MacDonogh (1902–1961)
Seán Mac Falls (born 1957)
Patrick MacGill (1889–1960)
Thomas MacGreevy (1893–1967)
Louis MacNeice (1907–1963)
Derek Mahon (1941–2020)
James Clarence Mangan (1803–1849)
Hugh McFadden (born 1942)
Nigel McLoughlin (born 1968)
Brian Merriman (1747–1805)
Máire Mhac an tSaoi (born 1922)
Alice Milligan (1865–1953)
John Montague (1929–2016)
Thomas Moore (1779–1852)
Paul Muldoon (born 1951)
Gerry Murphy (born 1952)
Eiléan Ní Chuilleanáin (born 1942)
Nuala Ní Dhomhnaill (born 1952)
Nuala Ní Chonchúir (born 1970)
Dáibhí Ó Bruadair (David O Bruadair, 1625–1698)
Lughaidh Ó Cléirigh (c. 1580 – c. 1640)
Máirtín Ó Direáin (1910–1988)
Mary O'Donnell (born 1954)
Dennis O'Driscoll (1954–2012)
Seán Mór Ó Dubhagáin (died 1372)
Oengus Celi De (fl. c. 800)
Cinaed Ó hArtucain (died 975)
Mary Devenport O'Neill (1879–1967)
Antoine Ó Raifteiri (Anthony Raftery, 1784–1835)
Aogán Ó Rathaille (1675–1729)
John Boyle O'Reilly (1844–1890)
Seán Ó Ríordáin (1916–1977)
Frank Ormsby (born 1947)
Cathal Ó Searcaigh (born 1956)
Seumas O'Sullivan (1879–1958)
Eoghan Ó Tuairisc (Eugene Watters, 1919–1982)
Tom Paulin (born 1949)
Patrick Pearse (1879–1916)
Joseph Plunkett (1887–1916)

Q–Z
Anthony Raferty (c. 1784–1834)
George Reavey (1907–1976)
Lennox Robinson (1886–1958)
Gabriel Rosenstock (born 1949)
Adam Rudden (born 1983)
Blanaid Salkeld (1880–1959)
Maurice Scully (born 1952)
John W. Sexton (born 1958)
Eileen Shanahan (1901–1979)
James Simmons (1933–2001)
Michael Smith (1942–2014)
Sydney Bernard Smith (1936–2008)
Geoffrey Squires (born 1942)
James Stephens (1880–1950)
Jonathan Swift (1667–1745)
Senchán Torpéist (fl. c. 580 – c. 650)
Katharine Tynan (1861–1931)
William Wall (born 1955)
Catherine Walsh (born 1964)
Jane Wilde (1821–1896)
Oscar Wilde (1845–1900)
James Wills (1790–1868)
Macdara Woods (1942–2018)
Frances Wynne (1863–1893)
W. B. Yeats (1865–1939)
Augustus Young (born 1943)

Short story writers

A–D
Robert William Alexander (1905–1979)
Ivy Bannister (born 1951)
Samuel Beckett (1906–1989)
Gerard Beirne (born 1962)
Elizabeth Bowen (1899–1973)
Clare Boylan (1948–2006)
Patrick Boyle (1905–1982)
John Boyne (born 1971)
Maeve Brennan (1917–1993)
William Carleton (1794–1849)
Joyce Cary (1888–1957)
Patrick Chapman (born 1968)
Padraic Colum (1881–1972)
Evelyn Conlon (born 1952)
Daniel Corkery (1878–1964)
Anne Devlin (born 1951)
Lord Dunsany (1878–1957)

E–L
Maria Edgeworth (1767–1849)
Brian Friel (1929–2015)
Frank Gallagher (1893–1962)
Gerald Griffin (1803–1840)
Aidan Higgins (1927–2015)
Desmond Hogan (born 1951)
John Jordan (1930–1988)
Neil Jordan (born 1950)
James Joyce (1882–1941)
Claire Keegan (born 1969)
Maeve Kelly (born 1930)
Benedict Kiely (1919–2007)
David M. Kiely (born 1949)
Mary Lavin (1912–1996)
Sheridan Le Fanu (1814–1873)
Edmund Leamy (1848–1904)

M–O
Walter Macken (1915–1967)
John MacKenna (born 1952)
Bernard MacLaverty (born 1942)
Michael McLaverty (1907–1992)
Bryan MacMahon (1909–1998)
Ian Macpherson (born 1951)
Violet Florence Martin (1862–1923) of Somerville and Ross partnership
Aidan Mathews (born 1956)
Eugene McCabe (1930–2020)
John McGahern (1934–2006)
Christina McKenna (born 1957)
John Montague (1929–2016)
George A. Moore (1852–1933)
Val Mulkerns (1925–2018)
Edna O'Brien (born 1932)
Kate Cruise O'Brien (born 1948)
Máirtín Ó Cadhain (1906–1970)
Billy O'Callaghan (born 1974)
Feardorcha Ó Conaill (1876–1929)
Pádraic Ó Conaire (1882–1928)
Frank O'Connor (1903–1966)
Mary O'Donnell (born 1954)
Julia O'Faolain (1933–2020)
Seán Ó Faoláin (1900–1990)
Liam O'Flaherty (1896–1984)
Seumas O'Kelly (1881–1918)

P–Z
James Plunkett (1920–2003)
Victor O'Donovan Power (1860–1933)
Lennox Robinson (1886–1958)
Peig Sayers (1873–1958), story teller
John W. Sexton (born 1958)
Somerville and Ross (1858–1949) and (1862–1915)
James Stephens (1882–1950)
Colm Tóibín (born 1955)
William Trevor (1928–2016)
William Wall (born 1955)

Children's and young adult literature writers 

 Sarah Bowie
 Niall Breslin
 Eoin Colfer
 Marita Conlon-McKenna
 Sarah Crossan
 Judi Curtin
 Oein DeBhairduin
 Aoife Dooley
 Patricia Forde
 Sarah Maria Griffin
 Paul Howard
 Oliver Jeffers
 Derek Landy
 PJ Lynch
 Dara McAnulty
 Oisín McGann
 Sinéad Moriarty
 David O'Doherty
 Siobhán Parkinson
 Niamh Sharkey
 Deirdre Sullivan

See also
Irish literature
List of Irish historians
List of Irish women writers

References

Writers
Irish
 
Irish chroniclers